David "Dudu" Goresh (born 1 February 1980) is an Israeli retired footballer.

Honours

Club
 Hapoel Be'er Sheva
 Israeli Premier League (3): 2015–16, 2016-17, 2017-18
Israel Super Cup (2): 2016, 2017
Toto Cup (1): 2016–17

References

External links
David Goresh - Profile Uefa
David Goresh - Profile Football Association in Israel

1980 births
Living people
Israeli footballers
Israeli Jews
Maccabi Petah Tikva F.C. players
Hapoel Acre F.C. players
Hapoel Be'er Sheva F.C. players
Beitar Jerusalem F.C. players
Israeli Premier League players
Liga Leumit players
Footballers from Acre, Israel
Association football goalkeepers